Ježevica is a Serbian Orthodox monastery dedicated to St. Nicholas, located at the foothills of the Jelica mountain in Ježevica near Čačak. It is registered as a Cultural Heritage of Serbia (1982). The Ježevica manuscript, claimed to date to the 14th century, makes mention of the founding by a nobleman in the service of King Stefan Dušan (r. 1331–55), ban Milutin and his wife in 1337. According to tradition it was founded by King Stefan Milutin. Its interior was painted in 1609 and 1637. The baroque church bell tower was built in the 19th century.

References

External links

Serbian Orthodox monasteries in Serbia
17th-century Serbian Orthodox church buildings
Čačak